Prikamye (Russian: Прикамье) is a region near the Kama river to the west of the Ural Mountains.

The literal translation of the name "Prikamye" is an area near the Kama river.

The word "Prikamye" is often used as synonym of Perm Krai.

External links
 Heritage of Perm 

Regions of Russia
Geography of Perm Krai